Yesterday/Today/Tomorrow (Traceability is Credibility) is an ongoing conceptual art and research project created by Bryan McCormack, encompassing drawings by thousands of individuals, social media, and installation art, as well as educational and community projects, in partnership with several universities in Europe. Its focus is the European refugee crisis.

Development 

Since 2016, McCormack, both individually and with a team of volunteers, has visited centres, squats and refugee camps in 11 countries across Europe and North Africa, specifically Morocco. At each location the team work with refugees, inviting them to produce three drawings: one of their life before (Yesterday), one of their current life (Today) and one of their life imagined in the future (Tomorrow). The drawings have been shared through the project's social media accounts.

Exhibitions 

Several hundred of these refugee drawings, along with multidisciplinary installation art, inspired by the stories the drawings depict, were shown in Italy at the Fondazione Giorgio Cini during the May 2017 Venice Biennale. This installation was in conjunction with a performance, curated by the artist and Dr. Henry Bell, and 40 students from Sheffield Hallam University.

References

External links 
 

Works about the European migrant crisis
Installation art works
Collaborative projects
21st-century drawings
Video art
Social media campaigns